Sucsy may refer to:

People

Michael Sucsy (born 1973), American film director

Companies

Sucsy, Fischer & Company, investment bank in Chicago, Illinois